Perdita "Perdy" Hyde-Sinclair (also Hyde) is a fictional character from the British soap opera Emmerdale, played by Georgia Slowe. She made her first on screen appearance on 1 March 2006.

Casting
In March 2006, Inside Soap announced Slowe and Christopher Villiers had joined the cast of Emmerdale on a regular basis, playing Perdita and Grayson Sinclair. The characters move into Oakwell Hall, after previously appearing in the run up to Sadie King (Patsy Kensit) and Alasdair Sinclair's (Ray Coulthard) wedding. Perdita was initially described as being similar to Sadie, with an Emmerdale spokesperson saying "Like Sadie, Perdy loves money, men and getting her way. She'll turn heads straight away, but whether she'll risk her marriage and status for a fling remains to be seen."

In December 2007, Slowe told Graham Young of the Birmingham Mail that her introduction to Emmerdale had been quiet and for the first six months she and Villiers had nothing to do. Slowe explained "We literally limped in and occasionally ambled into The Woolpack and bought an orange juice, so we were pulling our hair out. When they introduce new families, they have to do it very carefully, let people get used to you." The actress added the process of being introduced so gently was frustrating and only after the first six months did her character begin to evolve.

Storylines
Perdita seemed to have it all. Brains, beauty and a happy marriage to Grayson Sinclair (Christopher Villiers) – what more could a woman ask for? In reality, the gorgeous brunette nursed a secret. Her marriage to Grayson may seem a perfect match but his wandering eye caused her a lot of pain.

Soon after arriving, Perdita flirted with vet Hari Prasad (John Nayagam), wanting to make Grayson jealous but could not be unfaithful despite Grayson's infidelities. She and Hari became good friends and Perdita needed her friends as Rosemary (Linda Thorson), her manipulative mother-in-law, felt Perdita was not good enough for Grayson. She was not pleased that Perdita had not presented her with any grandchildren and made that very clear but on learning of Perdita's repeated miscarriages was only concerned about Perdita being a danger to the family name. Grayson was shocked by what Perdita had suffered alone and promised to provide for her regardless as he had simply assumed that she'd never conceived until she told him otherwise. While Grayson loved her, Perdita had agreed to turn a blind eye to his cheating as viewers were shocked to learn that he occasionally had one night stands with other men. When Perdita suspected Grayson was cheating again, she got revenge by sleeping with Matthew King (Matt Healy). He was eager to take their relationship further but Perdita was still committed to Grayson so she and Matthew also became good friends. When she suspected she was pregnant, she confessed to Grayson as she was worried about who the father could be, but was relieved to find it was a false alarm. Attempting to make amends for his cheating, Grayson bought Mill Cottage. Seeing Grayson put Perdita first, Rosemary began causing trouble between them.

Perdita also made friends with Paul Lambert (Mathew Bose) and Katie Sugden (Sammy Winward). She made friends with Paul after he rescued Grayson from teenagers who attacked him in a park in Hotten and made friends with Katie after stabling her horse at Katie's stable business, then run from Butlers' Farm.

In April, Perdita was thrilled to discover she was pregnant but after telling Katie that she was bleeding, Katie insisted on calling an ambulance. On reaching the hospital, Perdita had collapsed and was diagnosed with a cornual pregnancy, meaning that the pregnancy was ectopic and she needed an emergency hysterectomy. Grayson told Perdita what had happened when she came round and Perdita instantly told Grayson that their marriage was over but he refused to leave. They discussed their marriage at length and agreed to look into other ways of having a family as Perdita still had her ovaries. After her operation, Perdita began suffering insomnia and mood swings. Grayson was worried and booked a doctor's appointment. He diagnosed depression and prescribed antidepressants. This was not the first time Perdita had suffered from depression.

While her husband and friends supported her, Rosemary began meddling with Perdita's medication, making Perdita think she was losing her mind. Rosemary wanted Perdita out of her and Grayson's lives as she was now incapable of giving Rosemary the grandchildren she wanted. However, just as Perdita discovered what Rosemary was doing, Grayson had been convinced by Rosemary to have her sectioned for her own good. Disgusted at this, Perdita refused to see Grayson and so Paul acted as go-between, relaying what each had said to the other. Matthew visited her and convinced her to "accept" her illness if she wanted to be released, which she did, while she and Matthew quietly plotted their revenge. When the truth was revealed, Grayson threw Rosemary out. Not feeling safe at Mill Cottage, Perdita was staying at Home Farm and Matthew hoped it would become permanent but Grayson told her that he'd thrown Rosemary out and convinced her to go home with him. The next day, Perdita saw Rosemary in the pub and revealed to everyone there that Rosemary was the cause. Rosemary told everyone that Perdita didn't know what she was saying but admitted the truth to Zak Dingle (Steve Halliwell). She was shocked when even he thought her behaviour was disgraceful. Perdita, worried that Rosemary would worm her way back into Grayson's affections, left for London. In the days that followed, Grayson got drunk and made a pass at Perdita's friend, Paul. Paul pushed him away and Grayson called it a mistake, blaming the drink and followed Perdita to London where he persuaded her to return.

On Perdita's return, her heart was not in her marriage. Unable to forgive Grayson for believing his mother, she and Matthew grew closer and began an affair. Meanwhile, Grayson persuaded her to start a family by taking their friend, Katie, up on her offer to act as surrogate. She agreed, but resenting Katie's constant presence, spent more time with Matthew as the IVF cycle progressed. After Perdita found a negative pregnancy test in the bin, she told Matthew that she was ready to leave Grayson and went home to pack but found Katie and Grayson celebrating. A second pregnancy test had been positive and so Perdita persuaded Matthew to wait until after the baby was born. She promised him that once she had her baby, she would leave Grayson but Grayson overheard them discussing this and helped Rosemary frame Matthew for murder. Matthew was held on remand briefly but Perdita found evidence that not only cleared him but threatened to do serious damage to Grayson's legal career, possibly even sending him to prison in Matthew's place. Perdita promptly blackmailed Grayson into going to the police so Matthew was released. She left him that night and joined Matthew at Home Farm. Katie, learning that Perdita and Grayson's marriage had collapsed, promptly threatened to have a termination as she was not surrogate for Perdita and Matthew. Horrified by this, Perdita blackmailed Grayson again to make sure that Katie kept the baby, which she did. Perdita also used her evidence to make Grayson sign papers to the effect that she would have sole custody of the baby once it was born. However, Grayson had had enough of Perdita constantly threatening him and told Katie what Perdita had been doing. This, plus Perdita's attitude towards her since she'd left Grayson, made Katie decide to play Perdita at her own game. Now a couple themselves, they planned to raise the baby together once Perdita's evidence had been destroyed. This news caused Perdita to attack Katie and knock her to the ground. Fearing a miscarriage, Perdita called an ambulance. Katie and the baby were fine but in revenge, Grayson told Matthew why Perdita and Katie were fighting as he didn't understand Perdita's evasive answers whenever he asked her what had happened. This caused an almighty row between Perdita and Matthew and he threw her out. Weeks later, following the discovery that Katie and Grayson had been for a scan without her and learned that the baby was a boy caused a row in the Woolpack and Grayson spitefully told Perdita that he and Paul had had a one-night stand. She then attacked him and he called the police, getting her arrested for assault and took out a restraining order. Feeling she had lost everything, Perdita left the village.

She returned in July 2008, shortly before Katie gave birth. Katie had now discovered Grayson's true colours and made amends with Perdita, asking her to look after the baby while she was at work, much to Grayson's dismay. She told Chas Dingle (Lucy Pargeter) that Grayson manipulated everyone and Perdita was simply a victim of his lies. When Katie gave birth, Perdita delivered the baby and later at the hospital, the ice was broken between her and Matthew. Katie and Matthew convinced Perdita to start a new life – just her and her son – and gave her £20,000. After some persuasion, she agreed that she should put her baby first and let Grayson look after himself. Perdita and her much longed-for baby son left the hospital. Grayson missed them by seconds and never saw the baby. In later episodes, she sent a photo of herself and the baby to Matthew, which he passed on to Grayson

Reception
A columnist for Inside Soap said that Perdita was "posh and gorgeous". When Perdita attempts to seduce Hari, they opined that she behaved in a "manipulative" manner and it was clear that she had an "ulterior motive at work". Graham Young of the Birmingham Mail said Perdita was "posh totty."

References

External links
Perdita Hyde-Sinclair at itv.com

Emmerdale characters
Television characters introduced in 2006
Female characters in television